Carolina Betancourt (born 30 October 1981) is a Mexican former tennis player.

She has a career-high singles WTA ranking of 561, achieved on 2 March 2015. On 14 September 2015, Betancourt peaked at No. 402 in the doubles rankings. She won one singles title and four doubles titles on the ITF Women's Circuit.

Betancourt made her WTA Tour main-draw debut at the 2011 Mexican Open in the doubles event, partnering Giovanna Manifacio and losing in the first round.

Playing for Mexico Fed Cup team, Betancourt has a win–loss record of 2–1.

ITF finals

Singles (1–0)

Doubles (4–5)

External links
 
 
 

1993 births
Living people
Mexican female tennis players
Sportspeople from San Luis Potosí
21st-century Mexican women